The 2016 Italian Basketball Cup, known as the Beko Final Eight for sponsorship reasons, was the 48th edition of Italy's national cup tournament. The competition was organised by Lega Basket for Lega Basket Serie A clubs. The tournament was played at the Mediolanum Forum in Milan this year. EA7 Emporio Armani Milano won their 5th cup.

Qualification
EA7 Emporio Armani Milano was automatically qualified for the tournament as the host team. The rest of the teams were selected based on their place in the 2015–16 Lega Basket Serie A standings.
 
Grissin Bon Reggio Emilia
EA7 Emporio Armani Milano
Vanoli Cremona
Giorgio Tesi Group Pistoia
Dolomiti Energia Trento
Banco di Sardegna Sassari
Umana Reyer Venezia
Sidigas Avellino

Bracket

Quarterfinals

Giorgio Tesi Group Pistoia vs. Dolomiti Energia Trento

Vanoli Cremona vs. Banco di Sardegna Sassari

Grissin Bon Reggio Emilia vs. Sidigas Avellino

EA7 Emporio Armani Milano vs. Umana Reyer Venezia

Semifinals

Dolomiti Energia Trento vs. Sidigas Avellino

Vanoli Cremona vs. EA7 Emporio Armani Milano

Final
EA7 Emporio Milano took the lead when the game started and didn't lose it for the rest of the game. Milano eventually won its first Cup since over 20 years.

References

2016
Cup